The Dobrodošao u Klub Tour (also styled as DUK Tour) was the second headlining concert tour by Croatian pop-folk singer Severina. It was launched to support of her eleventh studio album Dobrodošao u klub (2012). It was officially announced in February 2013, with dates for Balkan venues revealed. The tour began on 23 March 2013 in Rijeka, Croatia at Dvorana Mladosti, and concluded on 6 December of the same year in Split, Croatia at the Spaladium Arena.

The tour was also included some festival concerts. On 29 June 2013, Her tour was also a part of Celebration of Croatia's accession to the European Union. Severina also performed at the Strumica Open Festival, Macedonia on 18 July 2013.

Set list
The concert set list consists of 29 songs. As part of the concert, a part of the foreign song "Harlem Shake" was included.
"Italiana"
"Uzbuna"
"Lola"
"Harlem Shake"
"Tarapana"
"Mili Moj"
"Gade"
"Daj da biram"
"Tango“ (Maestro dance Crew)"
"Dobrodošao u klub"
"Kamen Oko Vrata"
"Ostavljena"
"Prijateljice"
"Kradeš sve"
"Ko Me Tjero"
"Tuge od sna"
"Grad bez ljudi"
"Molitva: Gardelin"
"Pogled ispod obrva"
"Tridesete"
"Šta me sad pitaš šta mi je"
"Virujen u te"
"Maestro dance Crew/2CELLOS"
"Krivi spoj"
"Ajde, ajde zlato moje"
"Gas Gas"
"Ja samo pjevam"
"Brad Pitt"

Tour dates

Box office score data

References 

2013 concert tours